Dmitry Anatolyevich Dorofeyev (born 13 November 1976) is a speed skater. Dorofeyev won a silver medal in the 500 m at the 2006 Winter Olympics. His second-place finish was Russia's first Olympic speed skating medal since 1994. He placed tenth in the 1,000 m event. Earlier that year, he won silver at the World Sprint Championships.

References

External links
 
 
 
 

1976 births
Living people
Russian male speed skaters
Olympic speed skaters of Russia
Speed skaters at the 2002 Winter Olympics
Speed skaters at the 2006 Winter Olympics
Olympic silver medalists for Russia
People from Kolomna
Olympic medalists in speed skating
Medalists at the 2006 Winter Olympics
Sportspeople from Moscow Oblast